Chromatographia is a peer-reviewed scientific journal published by Springer Verlag, covering liquid and gas chromatography, as well as electrophoresis and TLC.

Impact factor 
Chromatographia had a 2020 impact factor of 2.044.

External links

References 

Chemistry journals
Publications established in 1968
Springer Science+Business Media academic journals
Monthly journals